The Nyakuron Cultural Centre (or NCC) is a government owned and controlled corporation established to preserve, develop and promote cinema and culture in South Sudan.

History
Nyakuron Centre was built after the 1972 Addis Ababa Agreement, which ended the First Sudanese Civil War. The center was officially opened in 1976 under the government led by Abel Alier.

The vast complex comprised with large gardens, an outdoor stage, an auditorium, a night club and a casino. Most of the local and international cultural festivals are held in the center, which includes; Hagana Peace Festival, The Juba Film Festival, the Kilkilu Ana Comedy show, international kickboxing competitions and art exhibitions. Besides, it is also rented out for private events such as weddings.

References

External links

 Vinka performance at Nyakuron cultural center
 Dinka Music: Ring Machakos live at Nyakuron Cultural Centre

Arts in South Sudan
Cultural organisations based in South Sudan
South Sudanese culture
Government agencies established in 1976
1976 establishments in Africa